The 2014–15 Longwood Lancers men's basketball team represented Longwood University during the 2014–15 NCAA Division I men's basketball season. The team was led by head coach Jayson Gee, in his second season, and played their home games at Willett Hall in Farmville, Virginia as members of the Big South Conference. They finished the season 11–23, 5–13 in Big South play to finish in ninth place. They upset Presbyterian and Charleston Southern in the Big South tournament to advance to the semifinals where they lost to Winthrop.

Last season
The 2013–14 Lancers finished the season 8–24 overall and 3–13 in Big South play, last in the Big South North Division, and second-to-last overall in the conference, only in front of Presbyterian. They lost in the first round of the Big South tournament to Gardner-Webb.

Departures

Incoming Transfers

Roster 
On October 29, Victor Dorsey was reported to be suspended for the first three games of the season due to an unspecified violation of team rules. On November 6, it was announced that Jason Pimentel was suspended indefinitely following a violation of team policy, relating to an arrest. On November 13, Quincy Taylor was ruled ineligible and was required by the NCAA to sit out three games, due to participation in an unauthorized basketball program. On February 14, 2015, Pimentel was restored to the team at the direction of athletic director Troy Austin, following his being found guilty and appealing the conviction to the Prince Edward County circuit court.

Schedule 

|-
!colspan=12 style="background:#091E3E; color:#A0A1A2;"| Exhibition game

|-
!colspan=12 style="background:#091E3E; color:#A0A1A2;"| Non-conference regular season

|-
!colspan=12 style="background:#091E3E; color:#A0A1A2;"| Conference regular season

|-
!colspan=12 style="background:#091E3E; color:#A0A1A2;"| Big South tournament

References

Longwood Lancers men's basketball seasons
Longwood
Longwood
Longwood Lancers men's basket